The Importance of Being Earnest is an 1895 play by Oscar Wilde.

The Importance of Being Earnest may also refer to:

 The Importance of Being Earnest (1932 film), directed by Franz Wenzler
 The Importance of Being Earnest (1952 film), directed by Anthony Asquith
 The Importance of Being Earnest (1957 film), an Australian TV performance of the play
 The Importance of Being Earnest (1992 film), directed by Kurt Baker
 The Importance of Being Earnest (2002 film), directed by Oliver Parker
 The Importance of Being Earnest (2011 film), directed by Brian Bedford
 The Importance of Being Earnest (opera), a 2011 opera by Gerald Barry

See also
 The Importance of Being Ernest, a 1959 album by Ernest Tubb